Juan Carlos Galindo Vacha (Bogotá) is the current head of Registraduría Nacional del Estado Civil, replacing Alma Rengifo in 2006. He was in charge of presidential elections in 2006 and is the most important figure in the national organization.

References

Living people
People from Bogotá
Year of birth missing (living people)